Bossage is uncut stone that is laid in place in a building, projecting outward from the building, to later be carved into decorative moldings, capitals, arms, etc. 

Bossages are also rustic work, consisting of stones which seem to advance beyond the surface of the building, by reason of indentures, or channels left in the joinings; used chiefly in the corners of buildings, and called rustic quoins. The cavity or indenture may be round, square, chamfered, beveled, diamond-shaped, or enclosed with a cavetto or listel.

See also
 Boss (architecture)
 Glossary of architecture
 Bossage (architecture) in France

References

Architectural elements